Elections in Kiribati are held every 4 years or, earlier, after a no confidence vote. They consist in the national elections of the Maneaba ni Maungatabu from whom is then elected the Beretitenti, shortly after, by the people. They are also local elections of the Councils (one council in each inhabited island and 3 councils in Tarawa).

Kiribati elects on national level a legislature and then a head of state - the president. The president is elected for a four-year term by the people. The House of Assembly (Maneaba ni Maungatabu) has 45 members, 44 elected for a four-year term in single-seat and multi-seat constituencies, and 1 delegate from Rabi Island representing Banaba. The initial number was of 35 in 1978, because the first elections have been held one year before independence in 1979, .
 
Kiribati has a Westminster system two-party system, which means that there are two dominant political parties, since 2020, but the political parties, that exist since 1965, are not central to political life.

Kiribati has an informal party system, and the website of the House of Assembly of Kiribati says the following on the topic:

Latest national elections

2020 Presidential election

2020 Parliamentary election

See also
 Electoral calendar
 Electoral system

References

External links
Adam Carr's Election Archive